"I'm Too Sexy" is a song by British pop band Right Said Fred, released in July 1991 as their debut single from their first album, Up (1992). The song was written by band members and brothers Fred Fairbrass and Richard Fairbrass with Rob Manzoli and peaked at number two on the UK Singles Chart. Outside the United Kingdom, it topped the charts in seven countries, including Australia, Canada, Ireland, and the United States.

Composition and recording
The idea for the song came about when the Fairbrass brothers were running a gym in London where, according to Richard, there was "lots of narcissism and posing". One day, he took his shirt off and started singing "I'm too sexy for my shirt" in front of a mirror as a joke. The band originally recorded it as an indie rock song.

It was rejected by multiple record companies before they played it to radio plugger Guy Holmes. He was initially unimpressed after playing it on his car stereo, but his passengers latched onto the song's "I'm a model, you know what I mean" hook and Holmes asked the band if they could rework it as a dance track.

DJ TommyD, an acquaintance of Richard Fairbrass, programmed electronics around the original vocal, whilst guitarist Rob Manzoli added a riff borrowed from the Jimi Hendrix song "Third Stone from the Sun".

Release
The single was released on 15 July 1991. It equalled the record for the most weeks at number two on the UK Singles Chart without ever topping the chart, staying at number two for six weeks in a row while held back by Bryan Adams' "(Everything I Do) I Do It for You" (this equalled the previous record set by Father Abraham's 1978 hit "The Smurf Song").

In May 1992, the song was nominated for an Ivor Novello Award for Best Selling 'A' Side. "I'm Too Sexy" was the act's first of several hits, particularly in the United Kingdom. They went on to have a number one single on the UK Singles Chart with "Deeply Dippy" in April 1992.

Chart performance
"I'm Too Sexy" was successful on the singles charts worldwide, becoming a hit on several continents. It made its way to the number-one position in Australia, Austria, Canada (The Record chart), Ireland, New Zealand and the US, where the single topped the Billboard Hot 100 as well as the Billboard Hot Dance Music/Maxi-Singles Sales chart. The song reached the next best chart position, as number two in Canada (the RPM Top Singles chart), Norway and the UK, where it peaked in its fourth week on the UK Singles Chart on August 11, 1991. It debuted on the UK chart as number 37 and was held off the number one spot by Bryan Adams' "(Everything I Do) I Do It for You". "I'm Too Sexy" spent six weeks at the number two position, before dropping to 5, 7 and 9, and then leaving the UK Top 10 in October 1991. In the US, the song also peaked at number four on both the Billboard Hot Dance Club Play chart and the Cash Box Top 100 as well as number 28 on the Billboard Modern Rock Tracks chart. Additionally, it was a top 10 hit also in Belgium (3), Ecuador (5), Greece (5) and Sweden (8).

"I'm Too Sexy" was certified gold in Australia (70,000), Austria (25,000), Canada (50,000), New Zealand (5,000) and the UK (470,000). In the US, the single received platinum status with a sale of 1 million units.

Critical reception
AllMusic editor Stephen Schnee described the song as a "humorous yet misunderstood swipe at self centered male bodybuilders and models." J.D. Considine from The Baltimore Sun wrote, "With its prodding piano and insistently tuneful bass line, "I'm Too Sexy" is an insidiously catchy single - the sort that sticks in your memory whether you want it to or not. Fortunately, head Fred Richard Fairbrass handles the vocals with enough good humor that the single's annoyance factor remains relatively low. David Taylor-Wilson from Bay Area Reporter called it "a campy send-up of the fashion world." Larry Flick from Billboard commented, "Thoroughly fun and goofy ditty recently heated up international dance floors and radio airwaves. Fred cheekily boasts about his physical attributes over a festive pop/house groove, which should have no trouble duplicating its success here." Andy Kastanas from The Charlotte Observer stated, "This midtempo "techno/house" beat has a catchy hook and unusual deep male vocals (a la Elmer Fudd on steroids) that'll put a meltdown on any ladies in the vicinity. You'll dance whether you like it or not and the lyrics are sure to give you some chucks when you sing along (and you WILL sing along)... "I'm too sexy for my car, too sexy for your party, too sexy for this song, too sexy it hurts" and on and on." 

British magazine Music Week deemed it an "eccentric" and "amusingly muttered 121.7bpm pop rattler". Clark and Devaney from Cashbox said, "Here is a fun, tongue-in-cheek dance tune that should get lots of club play." They concluded that the group "have put together a clever dance/club put-down of what could only be the whole fashion-model "poser" attitude that's so much in vogue." David Quantick from New Musical Express stated, "'I'm Too Sexy' is a great record, not least because it's a piss-take of people who fancy themselves sung by people who fancy themselves." A reviewer from People Magazine described it as a "dopey dance tune mocking fashion models and voguers—but it'll keep you moving." Spin wrote, "This 12-inch, along with its video, is the most inescapable assault on mass consciousness since "Gypsy Woman". Prepare to be impaled on a throbbing slice of masculinity courtesy of three roughnecks who've already had Mick Jagger down on all fours (they were once his trainers). Lie back and enjoy it."

Music video
A music video was produced to promote the single, directed by James Lebon. In an 2017 interview, Fred Fairbrass told that they had borrowed 1,500 pounds to make the single and then another 3,000-4,000 pounds to make the video for the song. In the video, the group performs while humorously posing as models on a runway set, surrounded by female photographers wearing bikinis. In between, there are clips of real models walking the catwalk at different fashion shows. James Muretich from Calgary Herald described the video as "campy". In the clubs, many people would imitate the band's "catwalk" dance as seen on the video, which was released in January 1992.

Impact and legacy
In 1993, "I'm Too Sexy" was awarded one of BMI's Pop Awards in the category for Most Performed College Radio Song of 1992. In June 2007, it was voted No. 80 on VH1's list of "100 Greatest Songs of the '90s". In April 2008, the song was rated No. 49 on "The 50 Worst Songs Ever! Watch, Listen and Cringe!" by Blender. In April 2011, it was voted No. 2 on VH1's "40 Greatest One-Hit Wonders of the '90s". In 2017, BuzzFeed ranked it No. 90 in their list of "The 101 Greatest Dance Songs of the '90s", adding, "Yes, this song is cheesy as hell, but it doesn't ever try to be anything other than what it is: a fun, catchy, campy dance song." In 2019, Billboard listed the song at No. 210 in their ranking of "Billboard's Top Songs of the '90s".

Track listing

UK 7" (SNOG 1) / cassette (CA SNOG 1)
"I'm Too Sexy"
"I'm Too Sexy" (instrumental)

UK 12" (12 SNOG 1)
"I'm Too Sexy"
"I'm Too Sexy" (7" version)
"I'm Too Sexy" (12" instrumental)

UK CD (CD SNOG 1)
"I'm Too Sexy" (Betty's mix)
"I'm Too Sexy" (7" mix)
"I'm Too Sexy" (12" instrumental)
"I'm Too Sexy" (Italian version)

US single
"I'm Too Sexy" (7" version)
"I'm Too Sexy" (Extended Club Mix)
"I'm Too Sexy" (Betty's Mix)
"I'm Too Sexy" (Instrumental)
"I'm Too Sexy" (Catwalk Mix)
"I'm Too Sexy" (Tushapella)
"I'm Too Sexy" (Spanish version)

Charts

Weekly charts

Year-end charts

Decade-end charts

Certifications and sales

Covers and adaptations
In August 2009, English girl group Sugababes included an interpolation of the song in their single "Get Sexy".
In August 2017, American singer-songwriter Taylor Swift released her single "Look What You Made Me Do", and credited Right Said Fred, as the chorus to her track follows the same rhythmic pattern of the line "I'm too sexy for my shirt".
In September 2021, Canadian rapper Drake released the song "Way 2 Sexy" with American rappers Future and Young Thug, which samples and interpolates the track. The song also topped the Billboard Hot 100.
In July 2022, American singer Beyoncé released the song "Alien Superstar" as part of her seventh studio album Renaissance, which interpolates the track.

See also

Billboard Year-End Hot 100 singles of 1992
List of number-one singles in Australia during the 1990s
List of Top 25 singles for 1991 in Australia
List of number-one hits of 1992 (Austria)
List of Billboard Hot 100 number-one singles of 1992
List of Billboard Hot 100 top 10 singles in 1992
List of number-one singles of 1991 (Ireland)
List of number-one singles from the 1990s (New Zealand)
List of RPM number-one dance singles of 1992

References

1991 songs
1991 debut singles
2007 singles
Billboard Hot 100 number-one singles
Charisma Records singles
Irish Singles Chart number-one singles
Narcissism in fiction
Number-one singles in Australia
Number-one singles in Austria
Number-one singles in New Zealand
Right Said Fred songs
Songs written by Richard Fairbrass
Songs written by Fred Fairbrass
Songs written by Rob Manzoli